Flavio Colin (Rio de Janeiro, June 22, 1930 - Rio de Janeiro, August 13, 2002) was a Brazilian comic artist and illustrator, considered one of the most important comic artists in Brazil. He began his career in the 1950s with an adaptation for the comic book radio series As Aventuras do Anjo, influenced by Milton Caniff, but began to gain prominence with the development of his own stylized artist style. In 1987, he was awarded with the Prêmio Angelo Agostini for Master of National Comics, an award that aims to honor artists who have dedicated themselves to Brazilian comics for at least 25 years. He also won the Troféu HQ Mix in 1994 and 1995. Flávio Colin died in Rio de Janeiro on 2002.

References 

Brazilian comics artists
Prêmio Angelo Agostini winners
Brazilian comics writers
Brazilian storyboard artists